Trebeše is a small village in the City Municipality of Koper in the Littoral region of Slovenia.

The local church is dedicated to Saint Martin and belongs to the Parish of Sočerga.

References

External links
Trebeše on Geopedia

Populated places in the City Municipality of Koper